Jamba Lakidi Pamba may refer to:
 Jamba Lakidi Pamba (1992 film), an Indian Telugu-language fantasy comedy film
 Jamba Lakidi Pamba (2018 film), a Telugu comedy film